Duke is an unincorporated community in southwest Phelps County, Missouri, United States. It is located approximately thirteen miles northwest of Licking and five miles east of Fort Leonard Wood. The community is on Missouri Route K and two miles east of a meander in the Big Piney River in the Mark Twain National Forest.

A post office called Duke has been in operation since 1906. The community was named after Duke's Mixture, a brand of pipe tobacco sold at the local country store.

References

Unincorporated communities in Phelps County, Missouri
Unincorporated communities in Missouri